The Economic Strategy Ministry (HaMisrad LeAstrategia Kalkalit) was a ministry in the Israeli cabinet.

List of ministers

External links
All Ministers in the Ministry of Economics and Planning Knesset website

Economic Strategy
Ministry of Economic Strategy
Economic Strategy
Economy of Israel
Israel